HMS Diadem was a  light cruiser of the Bellona subgroup of the Royal Navy. She was a modified Dido design with only four turrets but improved anti-aircraft armament – also known as Dido Group 2. She was built by Hawthorn Leslie and Company at Hebburn-on-Tyne, UK, with the keel being laid down on 15 December 1939. She was launched on 26 August 1942, and completed on 6 January 1944.

Service history

Royal Navy service
After the landings she carried out offensive patrols against German shipping around the Brittany coast, sinking, with destroyers, Sperrbrecher 7 off La Rochelle on 12 August. She returned to northern waters in September, where she covered Russian convoys and carrier raids against German shipping routes along the Norwegian coast, as well as making offensive sweeps herself. Diadem remained with the 10th Cruiser Squadron until after the war, and served in the Home Fleet until 1950. She was placed in reserve between 1950 to 1956. A more extensive modernisation than HMS Royalist's 1953-6 refit with new boilers and anti-nuclear washdown for Diadem as NATO flagship and AA/AD escort was canceled in 1954 on grounds of cost, the manual hand loaded armament requiring lifting 82lb shells, lack of space for crew and the non military functions of a cruiser, entertaing potential friends of Britain and carrying disaster relief resources. The transfer of Diademto Pakistan was on the pretext the ship would serve as a training ship, but in fact was a RN move, to balance the INS purchase of HMS Nigeria as arranged by First Lord Mountbatten in 1955 

She was sold to the Pakistan Navy (announced) 29 February 1956 and refitted at Portsmouth Dockyard before being handed over to the Pakistan Navy as Babur on 5 July 1957.

Pakistan service 

The refit was substantial, the light armament was standardised, fourteen new L60 40mm guns in three twin  Mk 5 mounts and eight single  Mk 7 mounts  as on INS Mysore (ex-HMS Nigeria). Radar was substantially updated to Type 974 navigation, Type 293 target indicator and air warning 281B at near 960 capability and ADR similar to HMS Euralyus the last operational RN Dido 11/1954.  A new bridge was fitted and the ship tropicalised. Surface and long range AA for the 5.25 turrets remained (2)WW2 standard 984/985 as on INS Delhi. She was renamed Babur, after the founder of the Mogul empire. The cost of the refit far exceeded the £400,000 allocated by the Pakistan Government  even supplemented with a 0.25 million dollar, US MDAP aid grant, and the refit by the Royal Navy dockyard, charged below cost. Pakistan still had to meet a huge shortfall in the bill. It had been known from the start of 1956 that the refit cost would exceed Pakistan's budget, but the new First Sea Lord, Mountbatten, the last Viceroy of India, was determined Pakistan would have a cruiser, as was head of Pakistan's navy Choudri. Despite his government's attempt to first cancel the deal in mid-1957, then demand the cruiser be decommissioned as an extravagance when it arrived in 1958, the British Government demanded a payment, which even the British Far East Command considered outrageous and likely to promote a political crisis. Defence cuts saw it temporarily laid up as a fully manned static training ship for cadets in 1961. However the cruiser was back in full operational service by 1963 and took part in Operation Dwarka after India invaded Pakistan during the 1965 conflict. Babur carried out a shore bombardment of Dwarka in September 1965. Fitting the cruiser with Styx missiles was considered in 1968  to counter the Soviet missiles purchased by India, but Russia was only prepared to offer the missile for fast attack craft, not larger warships. The outbreak of war with India in December 1971 saw Babur deployed as one of Pakistan's few available large warships, taking station 70 miles west of Karachi in an outer patrol zone, intending to protect the major ports of West Pakistan and oil tankers from the Gulf. Light 37mm AA and 40/60 Bofors at Karachi and other ports discouraged low level Indian Air Force bombing, below 2 miles high in IAF Canberra raids that occurred on Karachi. This led India to develop a plan to use its Styx-equipped Osa missile boats squadron with only Russian spoken in the Osa boats operation rooms for security, deception and commonality with the Indian officers trained in Russia for its major strike against the Pakistan Navy and the Karachi port installations and oil refineries. As the Osa missile boat squadron one Pakistan  Battle class  destroyers was sunk by 2 Styx missiles and another second hand Pakistan destroyer of the RN C class was massively damaged by another Styx (both the Battle and C class Destroyers were still in RN service itself at the time in 1971).  The 27 year old cruiser Babur somehow being missed, possibly due to its fitting with standard USN ESM/ECM similar to HMAS Yarram enabling the  Babur to electronically black itself out in time. Later during the night, after the failure of repeated Indian air force air strikes the Karachi tank farm of  oil storage facilities, were hit by Styx missiles from Osa missile boats causing a firestorm. Babur lacking anti-missile protection and ability to identify air and surface unit attacks was recalled to the naval base as a static flag ship.

References

Publications

External links
World War II cruisers
HMS Diadem at Uboat.net

 

Dido-class cruisers
Ships built on the River Tyne
1942 ships
World War II cruisers of the United Kingdom
Dido-class cruisers of the Pakistan Navy